People with the surname Partington include:
 Adrian Partington (born 1958), English conductor, chorus master, organist and pianist
 Blanche Partington (1866–1951), American journalist
 Brian Partington (born 1936), British Anglican priest, formerly Archdeacon of Sodor and Man
 Brose Partington (born 1979), American sculptor
 Charles Frederick Partington (died 1857?), British science lecturer and writer
 Edward Partington, 1st Baron Doverdale (1836–1925), English industrialist
 Gertrude Partington (1874-1959), British-born American painter better known as Gertrude Partington Albright
 James Riddick Partington (1886–1965), British chemist and historian of chemistry
 Joe Partington (born 1990), English football player
 John Herbert Evelyn Partington (1843-99), a member of the  Manchester School of Painters
 Jonathan Partington (born 1955), English mathematician
 Josh Partington, member of American rock band Something Corporate
 Lucy Partington (1952–1973/4), British murder victim
 Marian Partington (born 1948), English writer
 Oswald Partington, 2nd Baron Doverdale (1872–1935), English politician
 Peter Partington (born 1939), politician in Ontario, Canada
 Phyllis Partington  (1883–1933), American opera singer under the stage name Frances Peralta
 Ralph Partington (1806–1873), English-American Mormon pioneer
 Rex Partington (1924–2006), American actor, director and producer
 Sallie Partington (1834–1907), American Civil War era actress

Fictional 
 Mrs Partington, character created by American humorist Benjamin Penhallow Shillaber

See also
 The Adventure of the Bruce-Partington Plans, Sherlock Holmes story
 Stephen Patrington (died 1417), English bishop